Cappoquin House also known as Belmont is an 18th-century classical-style mansion overlooking the town of  Cappoquin in County Waterford, Ireland.  The house is the seat of the Keane Baronets of Belmont and of Cappoquin.

Previous castle
It is believed that the house was built on the site of an old Fitzgerald castle, of which the earliest known reference dates to 1598 when it was occupied by a Mr. Hayles and razed by Thomas Fitzgerald of Cappagh, who had probably forfeited it in the Desmond Rebellions. In 1641 Capt. Hugh Croker on behalf of the Earl of Cork occupied the castle, and successfully resisted an assault by the Confederate Catholics under General Purcell in 1643. However, it surrendered to Lord Castlehaven in 1645. It was subsequently captured by Cromwell in 1649. Nothing remained of the castle, apart from one wall with a narrow doorway leading to a garden when it was surveyed in 1918.

Current house
The current house was built in 1779. It is believed to have been designed by John Roberts, a noted Waterford architect.  The building is a detached seven-bay two-storey over basement house surrounded by notable formal gardens and landscaped grounds which are open to the public.

The house was burnt out on 19 February 1923 during the Civil War, but Sir John Keane, whose family had owned the house for generations, fully restored it as economically as possible using recycled materials and direct labour. He built a flat concrete roof using a technique developed by Waller known as nofrango.

The landscaped gardens are the work of Lady Olivia Keane who, after years of neglect following World War I, designed the grounds. There are some fine trees, Japanese cedars, maples and a southern beech, and a venerable oak that is included in Owen Johnson's Champion Trees of Britain and Ireland. Higher on the slopes are terraces with rhododendrons, azaleas, camellias and magnolias, and everywhere, fine views over the surrounding countryside.

References

External links
Official Site 
Entry on the National Inventory of Architectural Heritage
Blog and Photos of Cappoquin House by the Irish Aesthete

County Waterford
Historic Houses in County Waterford
Residential buildings completed in 1779